Tiberius Pollienus Armenius Peregrinus (fl. 3rd century AD) was a Roman senator who was appointed consul in AD 244.

Biography
Pollienus Armenius Peregrinus was probably the biological son of Lucius Armenius Peregrinus, who was appointed Praetor in AD 213. At some point he was adopted either by Pollienus Auspex or his son Tiberius Julius Pollienus Auspex.

In AD 243, Armenius Peregrinus was the Proconsular governor of Lycia et Pamphylia. In the following year (244), he was appointed consul prior alongside Fulvius Aemilianus. It is speculated that at some point he may have been the proconsular governor of Asia.

Armenius Peregrinus was married to the daughter of Flavius Julius Latronianus, the Praefectus urbi under Gordian III.

Footnotes

References

Sources
 Mennen, Inge, Power and Status in the Roman Empire, AD 193-284 (2011)

3rd-century Romans
Armenius Peregrinus
Roman governors of Lycia et Pamphylia
Imperial Roman consuls
Roman governors of Asia
Year of birth unknown
Year of death unknown